Nadezhda Sergeyevna Grishayeva (born 2 July 1989 in Leningrad) is a Russian professional basketball player. She plays for Russia women's national basketball team. She competed in the 2012 Summer Olympics.

References

External links 

Russian women's basketball players
1989 births
Living people
Olympic basketball players of Russia
Basketball players at the 2012 Summer Olympics
Universiade medalists in basketball
Universiade silver medalists for Russia
Medalists at the 2013 Summer Universiade